Democratic Left Movement may refer to:

Democratic Left Movement (Lebanon)
Democratic Left Movement (Peru)

See also
Democratic Left (disambiguation)